The Governor of La Pampa Province is a citizen of La Pampa Province, in Argentina, holding the office of governor for the corresponding term. The governor is elected alongside a vice-governor. Currently the governor of La Pampa is Sergio Ziliotto.

Governors since 1983

See also
 Chamber of Deputies of La Pampa

References

La Pampa Province
La Pampa Province